The Gladesville Mental Hospital, formerly known as the Tarban Creek Lunatic Asylum, was a psychiatric hospital established in 1838 in the Sydney suburb of Gladesville. The hospital officially closed in 1993, with the last inpatient services ceasing in 1997.

Description and history

Before 1838, people with mental or emotional problems in the Sydney area were housed in a "lunatic asylum" in Gladesville, a suburb located on the Parramatta River's Northern banks between Sydney and Parramatta, or in the Female Factory at Parramatta, twenty-four kilometres west of Sydney. In the 1830s, construction of a purpose-built asylum began on the banks of the Parramatta River, in the area now known as Gladesville. The original sandstone complex, known initially as Tarban Creek Lunatic Asylum, was designed by the Colonial Architect, Mortimer Lewis, between 1836 and 1838. Patients were then transferred from Liverpool and the Female Factory. James Barnet designed additional buildings in the hospital grounds precinct.

On 29 January 1993, Gladesville Hospital, together with Macquarie Hospital, was revoked as a hospital, and was amalgamated to form the Gladesville Macquarie Hospital. The last inpatient services were closed in 1997.

The first supervisor was John Thomas Digby, who sought to improve the treatment of the mentally ill, as did his successor, Frederick Norton Manning. On a visit to Sydney in 1867, Manning was invited by Henry Parkes to become medical superintendent of the Tarban Creek Lunatic Asylum. Before accepting, Manning went overseas and studied methods of patient care and administration of asylums; on his return to Sydney, he submitted a notable report. He was appointed to Tarban Creek on 15 October 1868 and immediately reported on the isolation of patients from their relations in accommodation best described as 'prison-like and gloomy', the inadequate facilities for their gainful employment and recreation and the monotonous diets deficient in both quantity and quality. In January 1869, the asylum's name was changed to the Hospital for the Insane, Gladesville, wherein patients were to receive treatment rather than be confined in a 'cemetery for diseased intellects'. By 1879 radical changes in patient care and accommodation had been made. Gladesville was extended and modernized, and an asylum for imbeciles set up in Newcastle and a temporary asylum at Cooma. Manning minimized the use of restraint and provided for patient activities

The hospital continued to grow, sometimes through acquiring nearby properties. One notable acquisition was the heritage-listed The Priory, a two-storey sandstone house in Salter Street, Gladesville. The house was built in the late 1840s, possibly by a family named Stubbs. In the 1850s, it was sold to the Marist Fathers, who influenced the early development of Hunters Hill. The hospital acquired it in 1888. It was listed on the (now defunct) Register of the National Estate in 1978.

In 1915, the designation was changed again when the complex became known as the Gladesville Mental Hospital. In 1993, the Gladesville hospital was amalgamated with the Macquarie Hospital at North Ryde to create Gladesville Macquarie Hospital. In 1997, all inpatient services were consolidated at the Macquarie, North Ryde site.

Heritage listings

The following buildings and structures have various heritage listings on the New South Wales State Heritage Register, the local government register of the New South Wales Heritage Database, and/or the (now defunct) Register of the National Estate.
 Cypress Grove, Victoria Road
 Doctor's Residences, south side of Punt Road gates and around Crown Close commonly called The Circle
 Escarpment Terraces
 Former Medical Superintendent's Residence, designed by Barnet
 Gardener's Store
 Gatekeeper's Cottage, near Punt Road gates
 Gatekeeper's Lodge, Victoria Road
 Medical Records Department, Victoria Road
 Original Quadrangle Complex of 1838
 Pottery Building
 Provision Store
 Punt Road gates
 Sandstone and stone walling within the hospital grounds
 Service Buildings group, between 1838 buildings and Punt Road gates
 The Priory, Salter Street
 Wards 17 and 18, designed by Barnet
 Workshop (former Male Ward 9)

Gallery

See also

Callan Park Hospital for the Insane
Parramatta Female Factory
Society of Mary (Marists) in Australia

References

Attribution

External links

Hospital buildings completed in 1838
Former hospitals in Sydney
Hospitals established in 1838
1838 establishments in Australia
Mortimer Lewis buildings
James Barnet buildings in Sydney
1993 disestablishments in Australia
Hospitals disestablished in 1993
Psychiatric hospitals in Australia
Municipality of Hunter's Hill
Gladesville, New South Wales